Paweł Marek Huelle (born 10 September 1957 in Gdańsk, Poland) is a Polish prose writer.

Biography
Huelle studied Polish philology at Gdańsk University and, in 1980, participated in the efforts to establish an independent student organization. He later became a journalist and worked for the press service of Solidarność (Solidarity). After the declaration of martial law, he cooperated with the samizdat movement. He has also taught literature, philosophy and history.

His literary debut came in 1987 with a novel  (translated as Who was David Weiser?), which was made into a film by Wojciech Marczewski in 2000. He is also a member of the Polish PEN Club.

In 2001, he won the Paszport Polityki Award for his book Mercedes-Benz. Z listów do Hrabala, and in 2008 was nominated for the Nike Award for his novel Ostatnia wieczerza ("The Last Supper").

His wife is painter .

Bibliography

Weiser Dawidek (1987)
Opowiadania na czas przeprowadzki (1991) (trans. Moving House and Other Stories Bloomsbury 1994)
Wiersze (1994)
Pierwsza miłość i inne opowiadania (1996) (trans. "The first love and other stories")
Mercedes-Benz. Z listów do Hrabala. (2001) (trans. Mercedes Benz Serpent's Tail 2005)
Hans Castorp w Sopocie. Zaginiony rozdział z 'Czarodziejskiej Góry (2002) (trans. Castorp Serpent's Tail 2007)
Byłem samotny i szczęśliwy (2002) (trans. "I was lonely and happy")
Ostatnia Wieczerza (2007) (trans. The Last Supper Serpent's Tail 2008)
 The Gift of Freedom, short essay, English, June 2009Works in Translation'''Who was David Weiser? Bloomsbury 1991 Castorp Serpent's Tail 2007, Mercedes-Benz Serpent's Tail 2005, The Last Supper Serpent's Tail 2008, Moving House and Other Stories Bloomsbury 1996, Cold Sea Stories'' Comma Press 2012,

References

External links 
 Paweł Huelle at Culture.pl

1957 births
Living people
Writers from Gdańsk
Polish male writers
University of Gdańsk alumni
International Writing Program alumni